Palladium sulfide may refer to:

 Palladium(II) sulfide (PdS)
 Palladium disulfide (PdS2)
 Other binary compounds of palladium and sulfur, including Pd4S, Pd2.8S, Pd2.2S

References